The 2016 Polish Super Cup was held on 7 July 2016 between the 2015–16 Ekstraklasa winners and the 2015–16 Polish Cup winners Legia Warsaw and the 2015–16 Polish Cup runners-up Lech Poznań.

Match details

See also
2015–16 Ekstraklasa
2015–16 Polish Cup

References

SuperCup
Polish Super Cup
Polish SuperCup